Robert Cooper (1650-1733) was a priest in England during the late 17th and early 18th centuries.

Cooper was born in Kidderminster and educated at Pembroke College, Oxford. He held the living at Harlington. He was Archdeacon of Dorset from 1698 until his death.

References 

Alumni of Pembroke College, Oxford
1650 births
1733 deaths
18th-century English Anglican priests
Archdeacons of Dorset
People from Kidderminster